Rajasthan Royals (RR) is a franchise cricket team based in Jaipur, India, which plays in the Indian Premier League (IPL). They were one of the nine teams that competed in the 2013 Indian Premier League. They were captained by Rahul Dravid. Rajasthan Royals finished 3rd in the IPL

Squad 
 Players with international caps are listed in bold.

IPL

Standings
Rajasthan Royals finished 3rd in the league stage of IPL 2013.

Match log

Champions League T20

Group stage standings

Match log

References

2013 Indian Premier League
Rajasthan Royals seasons